Charlie Tuck (11 November 1892 – 14 February 1968) was  a former Australian rules footballer who played with Richmond in the Victorian Football League (VFL).

Notes

External links 
		

1892 births
1968 deaths
Australian rules footballers from Victoria (Australia)
Richmond Football Club players
Cobram Football Club players